Carl Amery (9 April 1922 – 24 May 2005), the pen name of Christian Anton Mayer, was a German writer and environmental activist. Born in Munich, he studied at the University of Munich. He was a participant of Gruppe 47. He died in Munich.

Amery won the Deutscher Fantasy Preis in 1996.

Personal life 

Son of art historian Anton Mayer-Pfannholz, in his childhood he predominantly lived in Passau and Freising. At Passau he attended the Humanistisches Gymnasium Passau, at Freising the Dom-Gymnasium. Both cities left traces in his work. Passau appears in his novels Der Wettbewerb and Der Untergang der Stadt Passau. Freising appears in his novel Das Geheimnis der Krypta.

He was drafted into the army in 1941. In 1943 he became a prisoner of war in the Tunisian campaign. He returned to Munich in 1946 and resumed his studies in linguistics and literary criticism. He began to write, starting with short stories under the name Chris Mayer. Then he choose the pseudonymous Carl Amery, Amery being an anagram of Mayer.

He died of emphysema on May 24, 2005 and was buried at Ostfriedhof (Munich) May 30, 2005.

Work 

In 1954 Amery's first novel Der Wettbewerb was published. In 1958, now a member of the writers' association Gruppe 47, his novel Die große Deutschlandtour established his reputation as a satirist.

In 1963 his publications Die Kapitulation oder Deutscher Katholizismus heute and Das Ende der Vorsehung. Die gnadenlosen Folgen des Christentums revealed another side of his work. He allotted the global ecocide to Christianity and that predestined him as thought leader of political ecology. Further publications, particularly Die ökologische Chance, and his personal engagement emphasised this leadership. He was an early member of Alliance 90/The Greens, and in 1980 founded the independent E. F. Schumacher society.

In 1974 he turned over to science fiction and fantasy. For a "high literature" author an unusual step, influenced in particular by G. K. Chesterton. He later published Chesterton's Sci-Fi novels in a revised German version: Das Königsprojekt (1974), Der Untergang der Stadt Passau (1975) and An den Feuern der Leyermark (1979).
In the view of the scholar of German environmental literature, Axel Goodbody, Der Untergang der Stadt Passau skilfully dramatises ecology through the medium of science fiction.

Two further novels address fantasy and bavarian spirituality: Die Wallfahrer (1986) and Geheimnis der Krypta (1990). Goodbody comments that these have a more complex structure than his earlier science fiction, and are more elaborately intertextual. In his view, Amery's "entertaining use of the mechanism of time travel, his play with fiction and historical reality, his colourful juxtaposition of competing genre forms and linguistic registers, and his idiosyncratic use of metaphor, allusion and quotation belie a deeply serious underlying message."
In Geheimnis der Krypta, as in An den Feuern der Leyermark or Das Königsprojekt, Amery, like e.g. L. Neil Smith, discussed the influence of minor changes in special historic circumstances for changing the whole history.

He won the Deutscher Fantasy Preis in 1996.

In 2001 Amery stated in an interview that he would not publish any novels for health reasons.

Novels and short stories

Essays

References

Sources 

 

1922 births
2005 deaths
Writers from Munich
Officers Crosses of the Order of Merit of the Federal Republic of Germany
German science fiction writers
All-German People's Party politicians
Social Democratic Party of Germany politicians
Alliance 90/The Greens politicians
Ludwig Maximilian University of Munich alumni
Catholic University of America faculty
Burials at the Ostfriedhof (Munich)
German male writers
Deutscher Fantasy Preis winners